Pseudorestias is a monospecific genus in the family Cyprinodontidae, the pupfishes. The only species in the genus is Pseudorestias lirimensis which was described in 2017. from a type locality given as "Charvinto Creek near to the thermal pond Baños San Andrés about 6 km E of Lirima village, Chancacolla River, Tarapacá Region, northern Chile". It was also found in the Chancacolla River.

References

Cyprinodontidae
Fish described in 2017
Monotypic fish genera
Endemic fauna of Chile